Mixx FM 106.3 is a commercial radio station broadcasting from Colac, Victoria (Australia). It is currently owned by Ace Radio and broadcasts contemporary hits. The station features both locally produced and nationally syndicated content from NOVA Entertainment and from Grant Broadcasters. It has two repeaters: one at Lorne (92.7 FM) and another at Apollo Bay (95.9 FM).

References

External links
 
 iTunes
 Listen Live

Radio stations in Victoria